Wilbert Plijnaar (born 12 February 1954, Rotterdam) is a Dutch cartoonist and comics artist. He is the winner of the 1995 Stripschapprijs.

Biography
Plijnaar started his career working for Donald Duck in 1972. In the mid 1970s, he moved to the magazine Eppo, where he and Jan van Die started writing scripts for Sjors en Sjimmie and modernized the strip. The other comic he is known for is Claire, published exclusively in the women's magazine Flair.

In 1985, Wilbert Plijnaar bumps into Hans Buying of the Comic House Agency. The meeting ignites a close and productive collaboration that lasts for over ten years. During this period, Plijnaar is moving from Rotterdam to Amsterdam. There, both artists are working together on dozens of animation productions per year, rapidly making Comic House one of the largest animation producers in the Netherlands.

In 1995, he moved to Hollywood to work as a story artist. He has contributed to animated features such as Quest for Camelot, Osmosis Jones, Ice Age, Jimmy Neutron Boy Genius, Shrek 2, and Over the Hedge.

In 2019, Plijnaar released his biography Rotterdammer in Hollywood.

Personal life
He is the nephew of jazz singer Rita Reys. A portrait of her by his design is placed in the Oude Binnenweg of Rotterdam.

Filmography

References

External links
 Portfolio at Comic House

1954 births
Living people
Dutch cartoonists
Dutch comics writers
Dutch comics artists
Dutch animators
Artists from Rotterdam
Winners of the Stripschapsprijs